is a railway station in Yokoami, Sumida, Tokyo, Japan, operated by East Japan Railway Company (JR East) and Tokyo Metropolitan Bureau of Transportation (Toei).

Lines
The station is served by the JR East Chūō-Sōbu Line and the Toei Oedo Line, for which it is numbered as station E-12.

Station layout
Ryōgoku Station consists of two separate stations that are considered an interchange. The elevated station is operated by JR East and the underground station is operated by the Toei Subway. Although they are an interchange, passengers must pass through ticket barriers and pay separate fares to switch between services.

JR East
Ryōgoku is a local stop on the Chūō-Sōbu Line. "Rapid" trains bypass the station through a tunnel whose portal is to the north of the main station complex. The Chūō-Sōbu Line services use an island platform serving two tracks, with platform 1 used for westbound trains to central Tokyo and beyond, and platform 2 for eastbound trains to Chiba. As a remnant of its former terminal days, there is also a third platform (platform 3) at a slightly lower level used for special services only and not used by regular services.

Platforms

Toei
The Toei subway station lies on a north–south axis underneath  and has five exits, labelled A1-A5.

Platforms

History
Ryōgoku Station opened on 5 April 1904 as Ryōgokubashi, gaining its current name in 1931. The Toei Ōedo Line station opened on 12 December 2000.

Passenger statistics
In fiscal 2010, the JR East station was used by an average of 38,733 passengers daily (boarding passengers only).

Surrounding area
Ryōgoku station is located at the southern end of the Yokoami neighbourhood and directly bordering on the Ryōgoku neighbourhood. The station is close to sites such as the Ryōgoku Kokugikan sumo stadium, the Edo-Tokyo Museum, and the memorial to the victims of the Great Kantō earthquake.

Other landmarks in the surrounding area include:
 Yokoamicho Park

See also

 List of railway stations in Japan

References

External links

 JR East station information 
 Toei station information 

Sōbu Main Line
Chūō-Sōbu Line
Toei Ōedo Line
Stations of Tokyo Metropolitan Bureau of Transportation
Railway stations in Tokyo
Railway stations in Japan opened in 1904